Mitkovka is a rural locality (a selo) in Klimovsky District, Bryansk Oblast, Russia. The population was 417 as of 2010. There are 12 streets.

Geography 
Mitkovka is located 9 km north of Klimovo (the district's administrative centre) by road. Khokhlovka is the nearest rural locality.

References 

Rural localities in Klimovsky District